Gortamney is a townland lying within the civil parish of Kilcronaghan, County Londonderry, Northern Ireland. It lies in the east of the parish alongside the boundary of the civil parish of Termoneeny, and is bounded by the townlands of Ballinderry, Ballynahone More, Clooney, Drumsamney, Killynumber, Killytoney, and Moyesset. It was apportioned to the Drapers company and Crown freeholds.

The townland was part of Tobermore electoral ward of the former Magherafelt District Council, however in 1926 it was part of Tobermore district electoral division as part of the Maghera division of Magherafelt Rural District. It was also part of the historic barony of Loughinsholin.

History

See also
Kilcronaghan
List of townlands in Tobermore
Tobermore

References

Townlands of County Londonderry
Civil parish of Kilcronaghan